Regents of University of California v. Superior Court of Los Angeles County, 4 Cal. 5th 607, 413 P.3d 656 (2018), was a case in which the Supreme Court of California held that universities owe a duty to protect students from foreseeable violence during curricular activities. In an opinion by Justice Ming Chin, the Court tossed out the 2010 case in which Katherine Rosen, a former UCLA student, sued the university for negligence when another student stabbed her in a chemistry lab. Following this ruling, Rosen can pursue the case again in court.

The Court of Appeal, Second Appellate District, Division Seven initially held that the university's summary judgment motion was wrongly denied in students' action that alleged university breached its duty of care by failing to adopt reasonable measures that would have protected her from another student's violent on-campus attack, as a public university had no general duty to protect its students from criminal acts of other students.

See also 
Janet Conney v. The Regents of the University of California
Tarasoff v. Regents of the University of California

Notes

References

California state case law
United States tort case law
University of California litigation
University of California, Los Angeles